Marcus Aemilius Lepidus (died 216 BC) was the Roman consul for 232 BC, and according to Livy served again as suffect consul, possibly in 221.

He also served at one time as augur.

According to Livy, in 218 BC, at the onset of the Second Punic War, he was in Sicily serving as propraetor.

He died in 216.

It was in Lepidus' honor that the first gladiatorial games (munera) were held, on the occasion of his death. He was survived by his three sons; Lucius, Quintus, and Marcus. The latter was most likely the Marcus Aemilius Lepidus who was a Roman consul and Pontifex Maximus in the early 2nd century BC.

Notes

216 BC deaths
3rd-century BC Roman augurs
3rd-century BC Roman consuls
Marcus consul 522 AUC
Year of birth unknown